The Chanson V-Magic are a basketball team based in Shizuoka, Shizuoka, playing in the Women's Japan Basketball League.

Notable players
Anne Donovan
Maki Eguchi
Saori Fujiyoshi
Ha Eun-ju
Aki Ichijō
Sachiko Ishikawa
Tammy Jackson
Hiroe Kakizaki
Takako Katō
Miyuki Kawamura
Kumi Kubota Watanabe
Satomi Miki
Sanae Motokawa
Kana Motoyama
Chikako Murakami
Mutsuko Nagata
Akemi Okazato
Takami Takeuchi
Mayumi Yoshiyama

Venues
Shizuoka Prefectural Budokan
Shimizu General Sports Park Gymnasium
Mishima Citizen's Gymnasium
Inasa General Gymnasium
Welpia Nagaizumi

References

External links
Official website

Basketball teams in Japan
Basketball teams established in 1962
1962 establishments in Japan
Sports teams in Shizuoka Prefecture